John Betts Jr. (November 17, 1692 – June 27, 1767)  was a member of the House of Representatives of the Colony of Connecticut from Norwalk in the sessions of October 1731, October 1736, May 1739, May and October 1741, May 1742, and May 1743

He was the son of John Betts.

He was appointed to be an auditor of the accounts of the treasurer of the Colony of Connecticut on May 10, 1739.

He was a justice of the peace from 1746 to 1748.

References 

1692 births
1767 deaths
Burials in Mill Hill Burying Ground
Connecticut Comptrollers
Members of the Connecticut House of Representatives
Politicians from Norwalk, Connecticut
American justices of the peace
People of colonial Connecticut